Elijah Gardner, known as Lige Gardner, (c. 1846 - c. 1901) was a Texas gunfighter sketched in the book titled Pages from a Worker's Life by William Z. Foster.

Early life

Gardner was born in 1846 at Mississippi to an aristocratic Southern family. His family owned a plantation with slaves, but lost everything in the American Civil War. Gardner was described as "slight of build and dark-complexioned" in appearance.

Life as a gunfighter

The family migrated to Texas after the Civil War. Gardner married and fathered five children, being a farmer. He then learned he had Bright's disease and would often boast, "If I've got to cash in I might as well take along some of my enemies". Gardner's reputation as a gunman led to the killings of "two white men and several Negroes", according to William Z. Foster.

Notoriety

Gardner hired out his skills with a gun to the Southern Pacific railroad in the winter of 1901 in Eastern Texas, which was described as "tough country" where holdups were frequent. It was in the town of Echo, Texas near Beaumont where Foster noted Gardner's reputation as a gunman. He described Gardner as the "most hard-boiled boss" and that "gun in hand, he terrorized the Mexican laborers".

The last note that Foster made concerning Gardner was after the gunfighter had pistol whipped a cook for insulting his complexion.

Lige Gardner most likely died from his illness in later years.

References

Pages from a Worker's Life by William Z. Foster

Gunslingers of the American Old West
1840s births
1900s deaths